Walter Louis "Bud" Carpeneti (born December 1, 1945) is an American lawyer and jurist, who served as the chief justice of the Alaska Supreme Court from 2009 to 2012. He attended Stanford University and Berkeley School of Law. A Californian, Carpeneti moved to Alaska to clerk for two earlier Alaska Supreme Court justices.

Early life and education
Born and raised in San Francisco, California, Carpeneti was the son of San Francisco Superior Court Judge Walter I. Carpeneti.  After receiving an Bachelor of Arts in history from Stanford University in 1967 and a Juris Doctor from the UC Berkeley School of Law in 1970, the younger Carpeneti became a law clerk for Alaska Supreme Court Justices John H. Dimond and Jay Rabinowitz.

Early career
Returning to San Francisco in 1972 after the clerkships, Carpeneti initially entered private practice with Melvin Belli before joining in private practice with his father, retired Judge Walter I. Carpeneti, and his brother, Richard Carpeneti.

Leaving the family law practice, Carpeneti returned to Alaska in 1974 to join the Alaska Public Defender Agency as supervising attorney of its Juneau office.  He left the Public Defender Agency in 1978 to enter private practice with William T. Council.  During this time, he was a member of the Alaska Judicial Council and of the committee that drafted the Alaska rules of evidence.  He was also the reporter to the Supreme Court's Criminal Pattern Jury Instructions Committee.

Alaska judicial service
On October 15, 1981, Governor Jay Hammond appointed Carpeneti to the Alaska Superior Court.  While on the Superior Court, he was a member of the Alaska Commission on Judicial Conduct and of the Three-Judge Sentencing Panel.  He was also chair of the Supreme Court's Criminal Sentencing Practices and Procedures Committee.

In 1998, Governor Tony Knowles, a Democrat, appointed Carpeneti to the Alaska Supreme Court.  While on the Supreme Court, he chaired its Judicial Education Committee.

Carpeneti served as the 16th chief justice of the Alaska Supreme Court from 2009 to 2012.  During his term as chief justice, he also served as second vice president on the board of directors of the national Conference of Chief Justices.

Family life
In 1969, Carpeneti married Anne Dose, with whom he has four children: Chris, Marianna, Lia, and Bianca.

References

1945 births
Living people
20th-century American judges
20th-century American lawyers
21st-century American judges
Chief Justices of the Alaska Supreme Court
Alaska state court judges
Justices of the Alaska Supreme Court
Lawyers from San Francisco
Politicians from Juneau, Alaska
Stanford University alumni
UC Berkeley School of Law alumni